Ghiberti is a crater on Mercury, with a diameter of 110 kilometers. Its name, Ghiberti, was adopted by the International Astronomical Union (IAU) in 1976; after the Italian sculptor Lorenzo Ghiberti (1378-1455).

To the east of Ghiberti is the crater Smetana, and to the west is Sūr Dās.

References

Impact craters on Mercury